SYUN was a Japanese record label founded by Susumu Hirasawa in 1994. Hirasawa created the label to be able to have freedom to release some of his less commercial works (which later expanded to works by his associates, mostly members of P-MODEL, with most of the albums having Hirasawa involved in some way); the label was named after Shun, Hirasawa's experimental sampler unit, the label's logo is the cover of the Syun album SHUN・4, which was designed by Quiyoshi Inagaki. Distribution was handled by DIW Records, an independent label owned by the music store chain disk UNION. It released music sparsely, always in a pair of two (although the first release had a bonus third product if one were to order both first and second products; the third release was a similar case, although the bonus offer was two booklets; the sixth release had a bonus P-MODEL product for those who had purchased all 6 previous P-MODEL products), which were sold in record stores and through mail order. Hirasawa's direct releases were mostly material that was created years before it was released (the oldest one being from 1978). The label eventually stopped after Hirasawa/P-MODEL signed with Nippon Columbia and later on formed the Chaos Union company, giving himself more freedom to release what he wants. Hirasawa eventually released the Ashu-on [Sound Subspecies] in the solar system and HALDYN DOME box sets (alongside reissuing the P-MODEL video), reissuing most of the SYUN catalog, with most of the remaining releases being out of print since their release under the SYUN label.

Discography

References

Vanity record labels
Record labels established in 1994
Record labels disestablished in 1997
Electronic music record labels
Experimental music record labels
Rock record labels
Japanese record labels